Henrikh is an Armenian male given name. The English equivalent is Henry. Notable people with the name include:

 Henrikh Mkhitaryan (born 1989), Armenian football player

See also
 Henrik

Armenian masculine given names